The Bishop of Killala and Achonry was the Ordinary of the Church of Ireland diocese of Killala and Achonry in the Ecclesiastical Province of Tuam. The diocese comprised part of Counties Mayo and Sligo in Ireland.

The Episcopal see was a union of the bishoprics of Killala and Achonry which were united in 1622. Over the next two hundred and eleven years there were twenty-three bishops of the united diocese. Under the Church Temporalities (Ireland) Act 1833, Killala and Achonry were united to the archbishopric of Tuam in 1834. Following the death of Archbishop Trench in 1839, Tuam lost its metropolitan and archbishopric status and became the united bishopric of Tuam, Killala and Achonry in the Province of Armagh.

List of Bishops of Killala and Achonry

References

Killala and Achonry
Religion in County Mayo
Religion in County Sligo
Bishops of Killala and Achonry
Killala